Shawn Christopher Huff (born May 5, 1984) is a Finnish former professional basketball player for the Helsinki Seagulls of the Finnish Korisliiga. Huff played college basketball at Valparaiso from 2004–2008. Shawn Huff played for Finland national basketball team.

College career
Huff played college basketball at Valparaiso University from the 2004 to 2008.  Huff played as a true freshman, but did not become a full-time starter until his junior season where he started all 31 games, and then as a senior where he started all 36 games.

Professional career
Huff went undrafted in the 2008 NBA draft and went on to play internationally. Signed with the MHP RIESEN Ludwigsburg team on September 20, 2013 and recently played for them since till the end of the 2015–16 season.

On January 5, 2017, Huff signed with the German team Fraport Skyliners.

Shawn Huff retired after the EuroBasket 2022 from professional basketball.

Personal life
Huff is the son of professional basketball player  who played college basketball at Drake University and professionally in Finland. Leon Huff, was named to Drake's All-Decade team for the 1970s. Once Leon Huff was done playing basketball he managed some professional basketball teams in Finland. Leon Huff had three children including Dawn Huff (born 1972), Shawn Huff (born 1984), and Michael Huff (born 1987). His mother is named Kristina. Through his sister, Dawn, who married Stacy Elliott, he is the uncle of Ezekiel Elliott, who is a running back for the Dallas Cowboys of the National Football League (NFL).

References

External links
Eurobasket.com profile
Legabasket.it profile
Valparaiso Crusaders bio
RealGM profile
ESPN profile

1984 births
Living people
American expatriate basketball people in France
American expatriate basketball people in Germany
American expatriate basketball people in Greece
American expatriate basketball people in Italy
American men's basketball players
Espoon Honka players
ESSM Le Portel players
Finnish expatriate basketball people in France
Finnish expatriate basketball people in Germany
Finnish expatriate basketball people in Greece
Finnish expatriate basketball people in Italy
Finnish men's basketball players
Finnish people of African-American descent
Fulgor Libertas Forlì players
Helsinki Seagulls players
Kavala B.C. players
Lega Basket Serie A players
Maroussi B.C. players
Riesen Ludwigsburg players
Orlandina Basket players
Skyliners Frankfurt players
Small forwards
Sportspeople from Helsinki
Torpan Pojat players
Valparaiso Beacons men's basketball players
Vanoli Cremona players
2014 FIBA Basketball World Cup players